Germany hosted the Eurovision Song Contest 2011 in Düsseldorf and selected their song through a national final, organised by German broadcaster ARD in collaboration with Norddeutscher Rundfunk (NDR). In June 2010, ARD announced that Lena Meyer-Landrut would represent Germany at the contest again.

Before Eurovision

Artist selection 
At the winner's press conference of the Eurovision Song Contest 2010, Stefan Raab announced that Lena Meyer-Landrut would again represent the Germany in the Eurovision Song Contest 2011 to defend her title. On 30 June 2010, NDR confirmed that they had internally selected Meyer-Landrut to represent the country.

Unser Song für Deutschland 

Unser Song für Deutschland (English: Our Song for Germany) was the song selection to select the song that Lena Meyer-Landrut would perform at the 2011 Eurovision Song Contest. The competition consisted of two semi-finals on 31 January and 7 February 2011 and a final on 18 February 2011 all taking place at the Köln-Mülheim Studios in Cologne, hosted by Matthias Opdenhövel and Sabine Heinrich. Like in the previous year, the national final was co-produced by the production company Brainpool, which would also co-produce the 2011 Eurovision Song Contest in Düsseldorf. The semi-finals were broadcast on ProSieben and the final was broadcast on Das Erste as well as online via ARD's official website daserste.de. The final of the competition was watched by 3.25 million viewers in Germany.

Competing entries 
German and international composers and lyricists were called upon to submit their entries for the competition. Between 400 and 600 entries were received. A panel of music experts together with Stefan Raab selected the top twelve songs. The twelve participating songs were announced during the semi-finals of the competition.

Semi-finals 
Two semi-finals took place on 31 January and 7 February 2011. In each semi-final Meyer-Landrut presented six songs and three were selected by public voting to proceed to the final. Public voting included options for landline and SMS voting. Each show featured a panel of music experts which provided feedback in regards to the songs during the show.

Final 
The televised final took place on 18 February 2011. Meyer-Landrut performed the six finalist songs and the winning was selected through two rounds of public voting. Public voting included options for landline and SMS voting. In the first round of voting, the top two songs were selected to proceed to the second round. In the second round, the winning song, "Taken by a Stranger", was selected. The members of the expert music panel consisted of Stefan Raab, Barbara Schöneberger and Adel Tawil.

At Eurovision 
Germany was the host of the Eurovision Song Contest 2011 and a "Big Five" member and was therefore in the final, on 14 May. Germany voted in the second semi-final. Lena finished 10th in the final with 107 points. The public awarded Germany 9th place with 113 points and the jury awarded 10th place with 104 points.

Voting

Points awarded to Germany

Points awarded by Germany

Split results from Germany

References

External links
 NDR's official Eurovision site
 Official "Unser Song für Deutschland" site

2011
Countries in the Eurovision Song Contest 2011
Eurovision
Eurovision